Raymond Keith Bunkell (18 September 1949 – March 2000) was an English footballer who played as a midfielder in the Football League. He played with Tottenham Hotspur, Swindon Town and Colchester United.

References

External links
Statistics with Colchester United F.C.
Statistics with Swindon Town F.C.

1949 births
2000 deaths
English footballers
Footballers from Edmonton, London
Association football midfielders
Tottenham Hotspur F.C. players
Swindon Town F.C. players
Colchester United F.C. players
English Football League players